Netty Pinna (also Anette-Elise Pinna, until 1908 Adler; 28 June 1883 Simuna, Avanduse Parish – 28 April 1937 Tallinn) was an Estonian actress.

In 1908, she studied in Berlin in Emanuel Reicher's theatre courses. In 1903, she started her stage activity at Estonia Theatre. In 1906-1936, she worked (with pauses) also at the Estonia Theatre.

She was married to the actor and stage director Paul Pinna.

Theatre roles

 Anna (Gorky's Põhjas, 1903)
 Tatjana (Chekov's Juubel, 1906 in Estonia Theatre)
 Marta Adson (Metsanurk's Päikese tõusul, 1906 in Estonia Theatre)

Film roles
Kuldne ämblik (1930)

Awards
 1936: Merited Actor

References

1883 births
1937 deaths
Estonian stage actresses
20th-century Estonian actresses
Burials at Metsakalmistu
People from Väike-Maarja Parish